The Piano Trio No. 3 in F minor, Op. 65 (B. 130), is a piano trio by Antonín Dvořák. As with the Scherzo capriccioso, the Hussite Overture, the Ballade in D minor, and the Seventh Symphony, composed in the same period, the work is written in a more dramatic, dark and aggressive style that supersedes the carefree folk style of Dvořák's "Slavonic period".

Structure 
The composition consists of four movements in the classical tradition:

A typical performance takes approximately 39 minutes.

History 
Dvořák began writing out the piano trio in February 1883 and completed it on 31 March. The premiere was held on 27 October 1883 at a concert in Mladá Boleslav; Dvořák  himself played the piano part. The piece was published shortly after by Simrock.

Reception 
Eduard Hanslick wrote in the Neue Freie Presse on 13 February 1884: "The most valuable gem brought to us amid the plethora of concerts in recent weeks is undeniably Dvorak’s new Piano Trio in F minor. It demonstrates that the composer finds himself at the pinnacle of his career."

References

External links 
 
 , performed by the Beaux Arts Trio

1883 compositions
Compositions in F minor
Piano trios by Antonín Dvořák